Wolstencroft may refer to:

People

David Wolstencroft, Scottish television writer and author
 Ramon D. Wolstencroft (1936-2017), Astronomer AAS obituary
Richard Wolstencroft, Australian filmmaker
Simon Wolstencroft, English drummer, songwriter, and band member
Mary Wollstonecraft, philosopher, author of A Vindication of the Rights of Woman, mother of Mary Shelley
Mary Wollstonecraft Godwin Shelley, Writer of Frankenstein.

See also
 Woolstencroft
 Wollstonecraft (disambiguation)